Amori miei (internationally released as My Loves) is a 1978 Italian comedy film directed by Steno. For this film Monica Vitti was awarded with a David di Donatello for Best Actress.

Cast 
Monica Vitti: Anna Lisa Bianchi
Johnny Dorelli: Marco Rossi
Enrico Maria Salerno: Antonio Bianchi
Edwige Fenech: Deborah
: taxi driver
:  old woman crossing the street

Reception
The film was the most popular Italian film of the 1978-79 season.

References

External links

1978 films
Commedia all'italiana
Films directed by Stefano Vanzina
Films scored by Armando Trovajoli
Italian comedy films
1978 comedy films
1970s Italian-language films
1970s Italian films